Traenheim is a commune in the Bas-Rhin department in Grand Est in north-eastern France.

A Jewish house church from 1723  survives.  It is an upstairs room in a half-timbered house renovated for use as a place of public worship  over the "vociferous" objections of the town's pastor but with the permission of the government.   The room still has Hebrew prayers on the walls.

See also
 Communes of the Bas-Rhin department

References

Communes of Bas-Rhin
Synagogues in France